Rash is a 2006 novel written by Pete Hautman.  It is set in the year 2074, in a futuristic America, that has become obsessed with safety and security.  Nearly every potentially unsafe action has been criminalized, to the point that 24% of the population is incarcerated.  Ironically, this large criminal population also provides the manpower that fuels the large corporations that now dominate the country.

Development history
Hautman's intent in writing Rash was to consider the consequences of the current trend toward increased safety and security that we see in the United States today.  He says that the book could perhaps be called "2084", due to themes similar to those present in George Orwell's novel Nineteen Eighty-Four.

Almost all the computer systems in the novel are called "WindO", referencing the Microsoft operating system Windows. A "WindO" is a standardized tablet PC that has seemingly replaced any other PC, which is implied to have a similar concept and functionality of an iPad or Samsung Galaxy Tab.

Reception
Kirkus Reviews calls the book "a winner", saying that it is "bitingly funny and unexpectedly heartwarming". In a starred review, Publishers Weekly called this dystopian fantasy of a futuristic nation wracked by litigiousness and terrorism "intelligent and darkly comic".

References

External links
 Pete Hautman's Rash website

2006 American novels
American young adult novels
American science fiction novels
Dystopian novels
Children's science fiction novels
Fiction set in 2074
Novels set in the 2070s